Senator Bussey may refer to:

Cyrus Bussey (1833–1915), Iowa State Senate
Thomas H. Bussey (1857–1937), New York State Senate